Actinodaphne stenophylla, is a species of plant in the family Lauraceae. It is endemic to Sri Lanka.

Ecology
Dry patana grassland, intermediate and montane forest subcanopy and understory

References

 http://plants.jstor.org/specimen/k000793004
 https://web.archive.org/web/20170503221646/http://www.mpnet.iora-rcstt.org/node/3118
 http://lauraceae.myspecies.info/taxonomy/term/17938/maps

stenophylla
Endemic flora of Sri Lanka